Minnesota State Highway 62 (MN 62) is a highway in the Twin Cities region of Minnesota. The route was part of County Road 62 (CR 62) until 1988, when a portion of the route was inherited by the state. The western terminus of the highway is at Interstate 494 (I-494) in Eden Prairie, where the roadway continues west as CR 62 to CR 101. The eastern terminus of the route is at the junction with I-494 in Inver Grove Heights. Locally, the original portion of the route in Hennepin County is known as "the Crosstown," though signage with this name does not appear on the highway itself, but only on local streets adjacent to the road. It is also used as an alternate name, even by the Minnesota Department of Transportation (MnDOT).

Route description
MN 62 serves as an east–west route between Eden Prairie, Minnetonka, Edina, Richfield, Minneapolis, Fort Snelling, Mendota Heights and Inver Grove Heights.  The route is constructed to freeway standards for most of its length, except for the western , which is an expressway with two signal-controlled intersections. The eastern section is also an expressway except for the last mile between Mendota Road and I-494, which is again a freeway. The route is located in Hennepin and Dakota counties.

Due to the existence of a second State Highway 62 in the southwest corner of the state between Fulda and Windom, the stretch of MN 62 in the Twin Cities area starts its numbering at milepost 100. "Mile 100" is calibrated where CR 101 and CR 62 meet at the Eden Prairie–Minnetonka boundary line; though the mileposts themselves, starting with mile 104, do not appear until the state-maintained section inside the I-494 beltway.

History
MN 62 in the Twin Cities area was authorized in 1988. Prior to 1988, the route was designated as Hennepin County Road 62. The route was built mostly in the late 1960s by Hennepin County.

The original Hennepin County numbering of 62 corresponded with 62nd Street in Minneapolis. However, some portions of MN 62 do stray from the 62nd Street plane, as near the MSP airport, MN 62 runs along the plane of 58th Street.

MN 62 previously had a traffic light at its eastern terminus at MN 55 until an interchange was reconstructed during construction of the METRO Blue Line light rail in 2004.

I-35W and Highway 62 Crosstown Commons reconstruction project

The Twin Cities' MN 62 had one of the most notorious junctions in the region where it interwove with I-35W. This mile-long stretch was known informally as the "Crosstown Commons". Plans to "unweave" and expand this section of roadway to improve traffic flow had come and gone for many years, frustrating the 200,000 drivers who used it daily. Construction of the current design was expected to begin in July 2006, but was delayed due to state budget deficits.

The project was adequately funded during Governor Tim Pawlenty's second term and bids were received in April 2007. The bid was won by the Ames, Lunda, and Schafer consortium for $288 million. Construction began in May 2007. The project included 25 new bridges, 63 lane-miles of highway, and expanded the total roadway width from 6 lanes to 12 lanes at Lyndale Avenue. The bridges were cast in Coates, Minnesota, and trucked in for on-site erection. The new design includes transit/HOV lanes and was completed in November 2010. The new interchange features three through-lanes for I-35W (including one HOV lane) in each direction and two separate through-lanes for MN 62 in each direction, eliminating the need to weave across traffic. The 2007 cost of correcting the deficiencies in that short stretch of highway was estimated to be $285 million.

Extension 
In August 2018, the MN 62 designation was extended from its former eastern terminus at MN 55 near the Mendota Bridge to a new terminus at I-494 in the city of Inver Grove Heights. This new extension is cosigned as MN 55/MN 62 across the Mendota Bridge. Beyond the bridge, MN 62 replaces the former MN 110 in its entirety to I-494. This project has been designated "One route. One name" by MnDOT. The reason for the change was to assign a single highway number to this continuous route as opposed to the three different highway numbers (MN 62, MN 55, MN 110) that the route formerly had. MnDOT believes this will lessen the potential for motorist confusion. Now MN 62 in the Twin Cities area both originates and terminates at I-494, travelling across Hennepin and Dakota counties.

Exit list
Some exits have been numbered.

References

External links

I-35W and Highway 62 - Crosstown Commons - Reconstruction project - web page

062E
Freeways in the United States
Transportation in Hennepin County, Minnesota